Maneri Payan is a town and Union Council of Swabi District in Khyber-Pakhtunkhwa province of Pakistan. Coordinates: 

Taskeen Manerwal was a prominent Pashto poet from Maniri Payan.

References

Populated places in Swabi District
Union Councils of Swabi District